Nadorah  is a town and commune in Tiaret Province, Algeria. According to the 1998 census it has a population of 7,030.

References

Communes of Tiaret Province
Cities in Algeria